NUV may refer to:

Near visible ultraviolet (NUV) light with wavelength from 300 nm – 400 nm
MythTV internal file format .nuv